"Godzilla" is a single by U.S. hard rock band Blue Öyster Cult, the first track on the band's fifth studio album Spectres. The lyrics are a tongue-in-cheek tribute to the popular movie monster of the same name. The single release had a picture sleeve featuring a promotional still from the movie Ebirah, Horror of the Deep. Despite failing to chart, the song received significant airplay on rock radio stations and became a sleeper hit. The song, along with "(Don't Fear) The Reaper" and "Burnin' for You," is one of the band's best-known songs and has become a staple of its live performances. It has been covered by bands such as moe., Racer X, Fu Manchu, The Smashing Pumpkins, Sebastian Bach, Double Experience and Fighting Gravity.

Cash Box called it "a clever rocker tale of Godzilla...with a strong, catchy hook, excellent guitar and special effects."

In 2019, a cover of the song, sung by Serj Tankian, was featured in Godzilla: King of the Monsters, marking the first usage of the song in a Godzilla film.

Parodies
In response to the song's absence from the 1998 Godzilla soundtrack, Blue Öyster Cult members Eric Bloom and Buck Dharma created their own parody called "NoZilla", released only to radio stations.

Personnel 
 Eric Bloom – co-lead vocals, stun guitar
 Buck Dharma – co-lead vocals, lead guitar
 Joe Bouchard – bass guitar, background vocals
 Albert Bouchard – drums, background vocals
 Allen Lanier – rhythm guitar, background vocals

References

1977 songs
Blue Öyster Cult songs
Songs about monsters
Songs about fictional male characters
Songs about Tokyo
Songs written by Buck Dharma
Song recordings produced by Sandy Pearlman
Japan in non-Japanese culture
Godzilla (franchise)
Columbia Records singles